The American Association of Physicists in Medicine (AAPM) is a scientific, educational, and professional organization of Medical Physicists. In 2011, it absorbed the American College of Medical Physics

Their headquarters are located at 1631 Prince Street,  Alexandria, Virginia.

Publications include two scientific journals Medical Physics and the Journal of Applied Clinical Medical Physics (JACMP), as well as technical reports, and symposium proceedings.

The purposes of the American Association of Physicists in Medicine are to promote the application of physics to medicine and biology and to encourage interest and training in medical physics and related fields. AAPM has established Medical Physics as its primary scientific and informational journal.

AAPM is a Member of the American Institute of Physics and has over 8000 members.

Regional chapters of the AAPM hold regular scientific meetings for their members. For example the New England Chapter typically meets three times per year.

See also
 American Board of Science in Nuclear Medicine
 Institute of Physics and Engineering in Medicine

References

External links
AAPM web site
Medical Physics Journal
Journal of Applied Clinical Medical Physics

Medical physics organizations